The Video Collection is a DVD compilation of ten music videos by American singer-songwriter Anastacia, released on December 2, 2002. The release features extras including a biography, four making-ofs and two remix videos.

DVD features
Music videos:
"I'm Outta Love" – 4:03
"Not That Kind" – 3:20
"Cowboys & Kisses" – 4:40
"Made for Lovin' You" – 3:36
"Paid My Dues" – 3:30
"One Day in Your Life" (U.S. Version) – 3:24
"One Day in Your Life" (International Version) – 3:24
"Boom" – 3:31
"Why'd You Lie to Me" – 3:42
"You'll Never Be Alone" – 4:03

The making of:
"One Day in Your Life" Video – 25:03
"Boom" Video – 2:54
"Why'd You Lie to Me" Video – 3:44
"You'll Never Be Alone" Video – 9:26

Remix videos:
"I'm Outta Love" (Hex Hector Remix) – 4:12
"Not That Kind" (Kerri Chandler Remix) – 3:56

Special features:
Biography
Photo Gallery
Who is Anastacia? – 4:14

Charts and certification

Weekly charts

Certifications

References

Anastacia video albums
2002 video albums
Music video compilation albums
2002 compilation albums
House music video albums